Joe Davis (1901–1978) was a British snooker and billiards player.

Joe Davis or Joseph Davis may also refer to:

Politicians
Joseph Davis (Orange County, NY), American politician, member of the New York state assembly in 1847 and 1859
Joseph J. Davis (1828–1892), American politician, judge, and U.S. Representative from North Carolina from 1875 to 1881
Joe W. Davis (1918–1992), American politician, mayor of Huntsville, Alabama from 1968 to 1988
Joe Davis (politician) (1923–2021), American politician and judge, Florida state representative from 1962 to 1966
Gray Davis (Joseph Graham Davis Jr., born 1942), American politician and attorney, governor of California from 1999 to 2003

Sports
Joe Davis (1930s–1940s basketball coach), coach of Clemson Tigers men's basketball, 1930–39
Joe Davis (baseball), player in the 1939 St. Louis Cardinals season
Joe Davis (baseball, born 1914), player in the 1941 St. Louis Cardinals season
Joe Davis (basketball) (fl. 1940s), coach of Rice Owls men's basketball
Joseph Davis (tennis), player in the 1947 U.S. National Championships – Men's Singles
Joe Davis (American football) (1919–1992), American football end
Joe Davis (footballer, born 1938), English footballer (Bristol Rovers)
Joe Davis (footballer, born 1941) (1941–2016), Scottish footballer (Hibernian)
Joe Davis (basketball, born 1942), coach of Radford Highlanders men's basketball
Joe Davis (sportscaster) (born 1987), American sportscaster
Joe Davis (footballer, born 1993), English footballer

Military
Joseph R. Davis (1825–1896), American civil war general
Joseph Davis (Medal of Honor) (1838–1895), American soldier and Medal of Honor recipient
Joseph H. Davis (Medal of Honor) (1860–1903), American sailor and Medal of Honor recipient

Other people
Joseph Davis (explorer) (died 1715), employee of Hudson's Bay Company in Canada
Joseph Emory Davis (1784–1870), older brother of Jefferson Davis
Joseph Barnard Davis (1801–1881), English medical doctor, collector and craniologist
Joseph H. Davis (painter) (fl. 1830s), American portrait painter
Joe Davis (music publisher) (1896–1978), American music publisher, producer and promoter
Joe C. Davis Jr. (1919–1989), American businessman
Joe Davis (artist) (born 1953), artist in residence at Massachusetts Institute of Technology, USA
Joseph G. Davis (born 1953), Australian information systems researcher
Joseph S. Davis, American economist
Joe Davis (fl. 1990s), founder and owner of UK-based Brazilian music record label Far Out Recordings
Joseph Davis (fl. 2000s), American rap artist defended in "United States v. Joseph Davis" by William Spade

See also
Joseph Davies (disambiguation)
Jo Davis (disambiguation)
Joe W. Davis Stadium, a stadium in Huntsville, built in 1985
Joseph Davis State Park, New York State, US